Ahmet Cömert Sport Hall is a multi-purpose indoor sport venue located in Ataköy neighborhood of Bakırköy district in Istanbul, Turkey. The hall, with a capacity for 3,500 people, was built in 1998 within the Olympic complex. The venue has a parking lot capable of 150 cars. It is owned by the Youth and Sports Directorate of Istanbul Province (İstanbul GSM).

Named in honor of the Turkish amateur boxer and sports official Ahmet Cömert (1926-1990), the sport hall hosts matches of the Turkish Basketball League and Turkish Wheelchair Basketball Super League. Since 2005, it is home to the Galatasaray Wheelchair Basketball Team. Other sports, which take place at Ahmet Cömert Sport Hall, include boxing, gymnastics, fencing, chess and as well as some individual sports.

The venue hosts amateur boxing competitions in memoriam of Ahmet Cömert, which are held annually at international level.

In October 2012, Dizdar Sport Club's women's basketball team, which entered the Turkish Women's Basketball 2nd League (TKB2L), play their home matches at the Ahmet Cömert Sport Hall.

References

Sports venues in Istanbul
Indoor arenas in Turkey
Basketball venues in Turkey
Turkish Basketball League venues
Sports venues completed in 1998
Buildings and structures in Istanbul
Sport in Bakırköy
Boxing venues in Turkey
Wheelchair basketball venues in Turkey
1998 establishments in Turkey